Davis-Whitehead-Harriss House is a historic home located at Wilson, Wilson County, North Carolina.  It was built in 1858, and renovated in 1872 in the Italianate style.  It is a two-story, three bays wide, "T"-plan, frame dwelling, with a rear ell. It has single-shouldered, brick end chimneys with stuccoed stacks and a one-story, hipped roof front porch.  Also on the property is a two-story frame carriage house built in 1925.

It was listed on the National Register of Historic Places in 1982.

References

Houses on the National Register of Historic Places in North Carolina
Italianate architecture in North Carolina
Houses completed in 1858
Houses in Wilson County, North Carolina
National Register of Historic Places in Wilson County, North Carolina